Mkoba Teachers College is a Zimbabwean Teachers College located in Gweru, Midlands Province.

Mkoba Teachers College is one of the oldest teacher's colleges in Zimbabwe. It was officially opened on 10 June 1978. The college offers teacher training services to the academic community in Zimbabwe. Mkoba Teachers College is one of thirteen Primary school Teachers Colleges in Zimbabwe offering a University of Zimbabwe Diploma in Education programme comprising Theory of Education, Academic Studies, and Professional Studies.

See also 
 Education in Zimbabwe
 List of schools in Zimbabwe
List of universities in Zimbabwe

References

Educational institutions established in 1978
Buildings and structures in Midlands Province
Education in Midlands Province
Gweru
Teachers colleges
Universities and colleges in Zimbabwe